Kathrine Rokke (born 28 September 1970) is a retired Norwegian cross-country skier.

She made her FIS Cross-Country World Cup debut in March 1992 in Vang with a 47th place. She collected her first World Cup points with a 20th-place finish in January 1993 in Kavgolovo, and recorded her only top 10-placement in January 1994 in the same location. She retired from competitive skiing following the March 2000 Holmenkollen ski festival.

She represented the sports club IL Stjørdals-Blink.

Cross-country skiing results
All results are sourced from the International Ski Federation (FIS).

World Cup

Season standings

References

External links

1970 births
Living people
People from Stjørdal
Norwegian female cross-country skiers
Sportspeople from Trøndelag